John B. Heilman, Jr. (June 18, 1920 – June 4, 2013) was an American politician.

Born in Miller, South Dakota, Heilman served in the United States Marine Corps during World War II. He then went to South Dakota State University. Heilman and his wife bought the Highway Store in Miller, South Dakota and then he worked for the United States Department of Agriculture until he retired. Heilman served in the South Dakota House of Representatives as a Republican 1953–1954. He died in Miller, South Dakota.

Notes

1920 births
2013 deaths
People from Miller, South Dakota
Military personnel from South Dakota
South Dakota State University alumni
Republican Party members of the South Dakota House of Representatives
United States Marine Corps personnel of World War II